A total of 161 persons were indicted in the International Criminal Tribunal for the former Yugoslavia (ICTY). Since the arrest of Goran Hadžić on 20 July 2011, there are no indictees remaining at large. This article lists them along with their allegiance, details of charges against them and the disposition of their cases. The list includes those whose indictments were withdrawn by the ICTY.

Dražen Erdemović, a Bosnian Croat fighting in the Bosnian Serb contingent, and Franko Simatović, an ethnic Croat and high-ranking official of the Yugoslav State Security Service, are the only indictees on this list who crossed either religious and/or ethnic lines. Biljana Plavšić is the sole female ICTY indictee.

The ICTY announced a verdict in its last ongoing case on November 22, 2017: Ratko Mladić, sentenced to life imprisonment. One re-trial (two indictees) is ongoing before the International Residual Mechanism for Criminal Tribunals . 13 defendants were transferred to other courts, with 11 being convicted, one of them, Rahim Ademi, acquitted, and another, Vladimir Kovačević, was ruled mentally unfit to stand trial in 2004.

The list contains 161 names. 94 of these are Serbs, 29 are Croats, 9 are Albanians, 9 are Bosniaks, 2 are Macedonians and 2 are Montenegrins. The others are of unknown ethnicity or their charges have been withdrawn. There are 62 convicted Serbs, 18 convicted Croats, 5 convicted Bosniaks, 2 convicted Montenegrins, 1 convicted Macedonian and 1 convicted Albanian in this list.

List of indictees

Notes

See also
List of people indicted in the International Criminal Tribunal for Rwanda

References
 ICTY official site: The Cases
 ICTY official site: Key Figures
 ICTY official site: Judgement List
 CRS Report for Congress: Balkan Cooperation on War Crimes, Julie Kim, Specialist in International Relations Foreign Affairs, Defense, and Trade Division, 14 January 2008

International Criminal Tribunal for the former Yugoslavia
Dynamic lists
 
International Criminal Tribunal for the former Yugoslavia